The 1953 Minnesota Golden Gophers football team represented the University of Minnesota in the 1953 Big Ten Conference football season. In their third year under head coach Wes Fesler, the Golden Gophers compiled a 4–4–1 record and were outscored by their opponents by a combined total of 160 to 150.
 
Halfback Paul Giel was named an All-American by the Associated Press, FWAA, Look Magazine, Walter Camp Football Foundation and American Football Coaches Association. Giel received Chicago Tribune Silver Football, awarded to the most valuable player of the Big Ten. Giel was named All-Big Ten first team. Giel finished second in voting for the Heisman Trophy, receiving the most points for a player not to win the award.

Paul Giel was awarded the Team MVP Award.

Total attendance for the season was 293,313, which averaged to 58,662. The season high for attendance was against Michigan.

Schedule

Roster
 Gino Cappelletti #15
 HB Paul Giel

References

Minnesota
Minnesota Golden Gophers football seasons
Minnesota Golden Gophers football